The Noltenius Brothers is a 1945 German drama film directed by Gerhard Lamprecht and starring Willy Birgel, Karl Mathias and Hilde Weissner. Released in Berlin on 7 April, it was, by most accounts, the last of the twelve films released in Nazi Germany in 1945, before capitulation on7 May (Via Mala received its first public showing on the same day in Mayrhofen, but no longer made it to the cinemas).

The film's sets were designed by the art director Erich Kettelhut.

Cast
 Willy Birgel as Wolfgang Noltenius
 Karl Mathias as Werner Noltenius
 Hilde Weissner as Leonore, dessen Frau
 Eugen Klöpfer as Mr. Karsten
 Adelheid Seeck as Miss Karsten
 Karl Schönböck as Baron Kontakt
 Gunnar Möller as Jürgen Noltenius, Sohn
 Ida Wüst as Baronin von Terlingen
 Ernst Karchow as Bürgermeister Greifenberg
 Arthur Schröder as Ingenieur Friebe
 Adolf Ziegler
 Robert Forsch
 Hildegard Knef
 Hella Thornegg
 Gertrud de Lalsky
 Leopold von Ledebur
 Hans Meyer-Hanno
 F.W. Schröder-Schrom

References

Bibliography

External links 
 

1945 films
Films of Nazi Germany
German drama films
1945 drama films
1940s German-language films
Films directed by Gerhard Lamprecht
German black-and-white films
Films about brothers
UFA GmbH films
1940s German films